The Victorian Women's Football League (VWFL) was the oldest and largest Australian rules football league for women in the world, consisting of 47 clubs from Victoria, Australia, across seven divisions and a total of over 1,000 players.

The VWFL complied with the laws of Australian football. The official ball, a Sherrin, used by the VWFL, was a custom-made size 4.5 ball.

History
The Victorian Women's Football League was formed in 1981 with four teams competing at open level.

In 1995, Sal Rees caused controversy when she nominated for the 1995 AFL Draft: the nomination was subsequently voided, with the AFL amending its Draft rules to prevent any repeat of this incident.

The VWFL grew quickly, increasing dramatically the number of players and participating teams with a Division 3 added in 2001.

In 2002 VWFL player Debbie Lee made headlines for pushing to play against men in the made-for-television team the Hammerheads. She has commented, "My whole idea with the Hammerheads was to promote women's football. At no point in time did I really think I was going to play against the men, and frankly it wouldn't really have been smart for me to do that. My whole idea was to cause a bit of activity."

An U17 Youth Girls Competition was established by Football Victoria in 2004, primarily to provide a pathway to the VWFL. This was following legal action having been taken against them in the Victorian Civil and Administrative Tribunal (following a complaint to the Equal Opportunity Commission) by junior players Penny Cula-Reid, Emily Stayner, and Helen Taylor.

In May 2004, the first VWFL game was played at the Melbourne Cricket Ground (MCG) with the Melbourne Uni MUGARS defeating St Albans SPURS on Mother's Day. A second game was played at the MCG later in the same year featuring Melbourne Uni MUGARS against the St Kilda SHARKS reserves teams. 
  
In 2005, the VWFL celebrated its 25th season, and created a reserves competition for Division 1.

In 2006, the league posted a $6000 loss, however this was turned around in 2007 with a $19000 profit being posted at the end of 2007.  2007 saw five divisions (Premier seniors & reserves, North West, South East & Country) and 27 teams (from 20 clubs), and culminated in an Australian crowd record for women's Australian rules football at the 2007 Grand Final held on 19 August at the Preston City Oval in Melbourne. Two finals matches were also held at the Melbourne Cricket Ground for the first time.

The work done by the VWFL Media Manager Leesa Catto was instrumental in increasing media coverage across the competition. A significant partnership was negotiated with the Leader News group and weekly coverage was captured across the Melbourne Metropolitan area. Events like the participation of two VWFL players Shannon McFerran and Daisy Pearce in the E. J. Whitten Legends Game also helped lift the profile of the league.

The VWFL integrated into AFL Victoria in 2013. 

At the end of the 2016 season, it was announced the VWFL would be dissolved, with the forty-seven clubs and sixty teams of the VFLW would joining ten Victorian community leagues in 2017, along with additional clubs and teams from a further eighty clubs that had expressed interest in joining women's Australian football competitions. AFL Victoria would retain management of the ten-team VFL Women's league, with the remainder of the expected 150 teams to play in regional leagues.

Media coverage
In 2010 VWFL media coverage was captured across a range of mediums including;
Print Herald Sun, The Age, Leader, Star News and Fairfax Community Network
TV Channel 31
Radio 774 ABC Melbourne, 3AW, SEN 1116

Clubs
Premier Division

Division 1
 Bendigo 
 Cranbourne FC
 Darebin
 Diamond Creek
 Eastern Devils
 Knox
 Melbourne Uni
 North Geelong
 Seaford FNC

Division 2
 La Trobe Uni
 Motmorency FC
 Pascoe Vale
 Port Melbourne Colts
 Redan FNC
 St Albans Spurs
 Whitehorse

Division 3
 Bayswater Football Club
 Cranbourne Football Club
 Deer Park
 Endeavour Hills FC
 Kew Football Club
 Mordialloc FC
 Seaford FNC
 St Kilda

Division 4
 Brunswick Renegades
 Chirnside Park FC
 Fitzroy-ACU
 Hallam Football Club
 Melbourne University
 Port Melbourne Colts
 South Morang FC

East Division
 AFL Gippsland
 Ajax FC
 Bulleen Templestowe AFC
 Endeavour Hills FC
 Knox FC 
 Motmorency FC
 Rosebud FC
 Seville Ranges FFC

West Division
 Bacchus Marsh
 Jacana Football Club
 Kyneton FC
 Manor Lakes
 Melton Centrals
 Sunbury Lions WFC

Facts and figures

Division One/Premier Division

Source:

Premier Reserves

Premiers: North West Conference
2012 Bendigo
2011 La Trobe Uni
2010 Sunbury Lions
2009 Sunbury Lions
2008 Heidelberg Tigers
2007 Hadfield Hawks
2006 Diamond Creek Demons

Premiers: South East Conference
2012 Hallam Hawks
2011 Hallam Hawks
2010 South Mornington Tigerettes
2009 Scoresby Magpies
2008 Scoresby Magpies
2007 Yarra Valley Cougars
2007 Eastern Lions
2006 Berwick Wickers

Premiers: Country Conference
2007 Melton Centrals
2006 Geelong Cheetahz

Premiers: Division Two
2005 Lalor Bloods
2004 St Kilda Sharks
2003 Melbourne University Mugars
2002 East Geelong Eagles
2001 Hadfield Hawks
2000 North Heidelberg Bulldogs
1997 St Kilda Sharks

Premiers: Division Three
2006 Yarra Valley Cougars 
2005 Yarra Valley Cougars
2005 Diamond Creek Demons
2004 Berwick Wickers
2003 Surrey Park Panthers
2002 Mordialloc Redbacks
2001 Ferntree Gully Kangaroos

VWFL Life Members
2009 Leesa Catto
2009 Bron McGorlick
2008 Kerryn Stephen
2006 Chyloe Kurdas
2005 Di Smith
2004 Belinda Bowey
2003 Sally Rees, Rohenna Young
2002 Debbie Lee, Kerry Saunders
2001 Nicole Graves
2000 Lisa Hardeman (Who the premier div best on ground medal is named after)
1999 Ann Rulton (who the Volunteer Award is named after)
1998 Julie Allen
1997 Dianne Vaux
1996 Bernadette Marantelli
1995 Coral White
1990 Jan Wilson, Janet Graham
1983 Helen Lambert (who the Premier div Best and Fairest is named after - she is also the founding President of the League)

250 Games (as at end of 2011)
Debbie Lee (East Brunswick Scorpions/Sunshine YCW/VU-St Albans Spurs)
Kerry Saunders (Darebin Falcons/St Kilda City)
Belinda Bowey (St Kilda Sharks/Keysborough)

See also

List of women's Australian rules football leagues

References

External links

    VCAT ruling (PDF)
 Analysis of VCAT ruling

 
Women's Australian rules football leagues in Australia
Australian rules football competitions in Victoria (Australia)
1981 establishments in Australia
Sports leagues established in 1981